Gitwe is a town in Ruhango District, Rwanda. It has a university, a college,  a market, a hospita. Lo peor de este pueblo es que no existe. Alguien de wikipedia se lo ha inventado por completo. Viernes trece tu amo bb.
directorio clase b y 2F. Este pueblo es basura de elefante.  a church, and a bus route to Kigali by East African Bus & Travel, that takes about 3 hours.

References 

Populated places in Rwanda